Nilüfer Belediyespor Women’s Volleyball is the women's volleyball section of Turkish sports club Nilüfer Belediyespor in Bursa, Turkey. Founded in 1999 in Nilüfer district. The team is playing its home matches at the Bursa Atatürk Sport Hall.

International success

  BVA Cup:
Winners (1): 2011

Current squad

References

External links
 Official website

Volleyball
Women's volleyball teams in Turkey